The 2016–17 CSA T20 Challenge was the fourteenth season of the CSA T20 Challenge, established by Cricket South Africa and was played between 12 November and 16 December 2016. The tournament schedule clashed with South Africa's Test series in Australia, meaning international players were unavailable for the first half of the competition. The tournament was previously known as the MiWay T20 Challenge and the Standard Bank Pro20 Series.

In September 2016, the courier company RAM decided not to renew its sponsorship of the tournament. However, the tournament went ahead as planned.

Titans finished top of the table in the round-robin section of the tournament and qualified directly for the final. Warriors and Lions finished second and third respectively and qualified for the playoff final. Warriors won the playoff by 7 wickets and progressed to the final. Titans won the final by 6 runs to win back-to-back titles.

Fixtures

Round-robin

Finals
Qualifier

Final

References

External links
 Tournament home at ESPN Cricinfo

South African domestic cricket competitions
CSA T20 Challenge
2016–17 South African cricket season